Richardia scabra, commonly called rough Mexican clover or Florida pusley, is a species of flowering plant in the family Rubiaceae. It is widespread, native to warm areas of both North America and South America. In the southeastern United States, it is often found in disturbed habitats.

References

Spermacoceae